Brittany Gray (born July 25, 1995) is an American softball coach and former player. She attended Greenwood High School in Greenwood, Indiana. She later attended the University of Georgia, where she was an All-American pitcher for the Georgia Bulldogs softball team. Gray led the Bulldogs to the 2016 Women's College World Series second round, where they fell to LSU, 4–1. Gray  suffered a season ending arm injury in her senior season, forcing her to miss Georgia's run to the 2018 Women's College World Series. Gray was drafted by the Beijing Shougang Eagles of National Pro Fastpitch in the third round of the 2018 NPF Draft. Gray was named an assistant softball coach at Indiana State University on July 28, 2021.

References

External links
 
Indiana State Sycamores bio
Georgia Bulldogs bio

1995 births
Softball players from Indiana
Living people
People from Greenwood, Indiana
Georgia Bulldogs softball players
Georgia Bulldogs softball coaches
Missouri Tigers softball coaches
Indiana State Sycamores softball coaches
American softball coaches